The committees of the 8th Supreme People's Assembly (SPA) of North Korea were elected by the 1st Session of the aforementioned body on 30 December 1986. It was replaced on 26 May 1990 by the committees of the 9th Supreme People's Assembly.

Committees

Bills

Budget

Credentials
Not all members made public.

References

Citations

Bibliography
Books:
 

8th Supreme People's Assembly
1986 establishments in North Korea
1990 disestablishments in North Korea